The Rhade or Êđê (Rade language: Ānāk Dāgār / Degar people) are an indigenous Austronesian ethnic group of southern Vietnam (population 398,671 in 2019).

Etymology
The term Rhade is an old French inscription of Dāgār in the Rade language. The Rhade are also referred to as Ānāk Dāgār (Degar people). Ānāk Dāgār comes from the term Ānāk Kudāyā-Nāgār, meaning "Kudayanagar ethnic groups" or "the descendants of bok Kauṇḍinya and bia Nagar". The name "Kauṇḍinya" was derived from the name of Kampuchea, and "Nagar" refers to the primary goddess of the Cham people. As an ethnic group of the Vietnamese Central Highlands, the Rhade people's culture was influenced by both Champa and Cambodia. Because of their status occupying the border region between these two influences, the term Degar is also sometimes used to refer to the peoples of the Vietnamese Central Highlands as a collective group.

According to French scholars of Southeast Asian studies, the character of Monk Kauṇḍinya symbolized the Indian cultural sphere which influenced classical Southeast Asia through Po Nagar (Champa), Neang Neak (Kampuchea), Nang Khosop (Laos), and Mae Khwan-khao (Thailand). This legend was popular with the ethnic groups of the Vietnamese Central Highlands and other ethnic groups of Southeast Asia within the Indian cultural sphere.

Language

The Rade language is one of the Chamic languages, a subfamily of the Malayo-Polynesian branch of the Austronesian language family. Other Cham languages are spoken in central Vietnam and in Aceh, Sumatra; The Cham are more distantly related to the Malayic languages of Indonesia, Malaysia and Madagascar, and to the Philippine languages.

The Cham developed a writing system based on Latin script in the 1920s.

Kinship and social structure
The Rade practice matrilineal descent. Descent is traced through the female line, and family property is held and inherited by women. The basic kinship unit is the matrilineage, and these basic kinship units are grouped into higher-level matrilineal sibs (matrisibs). The Rade are further divided into two phratries.

The women of a matrilineage and their spouses and children live together in a longhouse. The lineage holds corporate property such as paddy land, cattle, gongs, and jars; these are held by the senior female of the matrilineage. The lineage also engages in the farming of common lands and maintenance of the longhouse. The head of the longhouse itself is a man, with the position most commonly inherited by the spouse of the daughter or sister-in-law of the previous longhouse head.

Matrilineages and matrisibs are exogamous, with both sexual intercourse and intermarriage prohibited. The phratries also impose some restrictions on marriage. Couples violating these restrictions must sacrifice a buffalo, though violating phratry restrictions is generally not seen as being as serious, and requires only the sacrifice of a pig. Residence is matrilocal.

Rade villages were traditionally autonomous and governed by an oligarchy of leading families. Some villages became locally dominant, but none formed any larger political structures.

Literature

Epic

Epics (Rade language: klei khan), such as Klei khan Y Dam San, H'Bia Mlin, Dam Kteh Mlan, Mdrong Dam, etc. are told by epic tellers (Rade language: po khan) next to the fire, through the night.

Music 

Êdê music is very diverse and playing music is the way that Êdê people communicate to both other people, and according to their beliefs, God (Êdê language: yang).

Musical instruments 

Gong: There are several sets of gongs used. The knah gong set is made up of six suspended gongs :knah, hlinang or knah hliang, mdu khơk or knah khơk, hluê khơk or mong, hluê hliang, hluê khơk điêt or k'khiêt, knah di, and the largest one is ching sar; as well as two bossed gongs: mđũ and ana (there is also h'gor drum). The others are: chinh k'ram. Rade gong culture has been recognized by UNESCO as one of the Masterpieces of the Oral and Intangible Heritage of Humanity.
Flute (Êdê language: đing): đing năm, ky pah, đing tak ta (or đing buốt klé), đing buốt tút, đing buốt trok, đing rinh, đing téc, đinh tút.
String instrument: brố or brok zither, goong.
Others: chinh đing aráp, gông kram, đing pah, đing ktuk, đing pâng, kni.

Style of music 

Kư- ứt: a kind of telling the epic accompanied with đing buốt trok.
Ayray: a kind of love songs accompanied with đing năm.

Architecture 

A typical house of Rade people is the longhouse made of bamboo and wood. The longhouse's length is measured by the number of collar beams (Rade language: de). Once a girl living in the house gets married, the house is lengthened by one compartment, as the matrilocal aspect of Rade marriage means that the husband will live in his wife's house. The orientation of buildings are North-South.

The longhouse's space is divided into two parts: Gah part's area makes up 1/3- 2/3 the total area is considered as the living room and the other part includes bedrooms. There are two doors: the front door is for men, the back door is for women and two stairs: male stair and female stair.

Longhouses can be 100 meters long and house from three to nine families. A traditional description of the size of the longhouse is: "The house is as long as the gong's echo".

Vietnam War
During the Vietnam War, American and South Vietnamese military advisers feared that the Viet Cong would convert Rhade tribesman in the Đắk Lắk Province to their support. They instituted a program in which American Special Forces sought to train the Rhade in "village self-defense programs."  These self-defense programs were highly controversial.

According to William Duiker, United States Foreign Officer and East-Asian professor, the training efforts, called "Civilian Irregular Defense Groups" (CIDG), were plagued with problems of arbitrary authority on the part of Vietnamese authorities and officers.  During the summer of 1964, "...Vietnamese arrogance led immediately to problems, and in September a serious revolt broke out among the Rhadé [sic] tribesmen in Ban Me Thout[sic].  Only with the aid of U.S. advisers was the crisis defused."

The Rade made up a portion of the United States' Montagnard allies, and after the war some fled to the United States, mainly residing in North Carolina.

Notable Rade people
Y Bham Enuol, leader of FULRO
Y Điêng, writer and ethnologist
Linh Nga Niê Kđăm, singer and musical researcher
Y Moan, popular singer
H'Hen Niê, Miss Universe Vietnam 2017, Miss Universe 2018 Top 5
Y Êli Niê, goalkeeper.

Gallery

Customary law 

L. Sabatier has collected 236 articles. The highest number of articles is of marriage and family matters, followed by property ownership and relationship between the heads of villages and villagers. The main principles are that communal nature and equality are under guarantee. Judges are called khoa phat kdi.

References

Works cited

External links

Êdê People in Vietnam
Ethnologue page
The Êdê, The Peoples of the World Foundation. Page about the Rade in the United States

 
Ethnic groups in Vietnam
Ethnic groups in Cambodia